Consort Wang may refer to:

Consort Wang (Wuzong) (819–846), Emperor Wuzong's consort during the Tang dynasty
Consort Dowager Wang (died 947), Li Siyuan's consort during the Later Tang dynasty

See also
Empress Wang (disambiguation)